Bub or BUB may refer to:

People
 Bub Asman (born 1949), American film editor and sound effects editor
 Bub Bridger (1924–2009), New Zealand poet and short story writer
 Bub Kuhn (1899–1956), Major League Baseball pitcher who pitched one inning for the Cleveland Indians in 1924
 Bub McAtee (1845–1876), Major League baseball player
 Bub Strickler (1938–2005), retired NASCAR Winston Cup Series driver who competed from 1965 to 1980
 Bub Walker (1907–1963), American football player and coach
 Bub Weller (1902–1993), American college football and National Football League player

Other uses
 Bub, a character from Bubble Bobble
 Bub (film) (English 'Father'), 2001 Kashmiri-language movie
 Belgische Unie – Union Belge, a political party in Belgium
 BUB Seven Streamliner, an American-built motorcycle that held the motorcycle speed record from 2006 to 2008 and 2009 to 2010
 The ISO 639-3 code for the Bua language, spoken in Chad
 Lil Bub (2011–2019), a female cat and Internet celebrity known for her unique appearance

See also
 Human genes:
 BUB1, budding uninhibited by benzimidazoles 1 homolog (yeast)
 BUB1B, budding uninhibited by benzimidazoles 1 homolog beta (yeast)
 BUB3, budding uninhibited by benzimidazoles 3 homolog (yeast)
 Buba, river in Guinea-Bissau
 Bubb (disambiguation)
 Bubba, a relationship nickname formed from brother
 Bubble (disambiguation)
 
 

Lists of people by nickname